Cabbage casserole is a traditional Finnish oven-baked casserole dish, typically made of cabbage, ground meat, rice or pearl barley, and additional flavourings—such as onion, marjoram—and a small amount of syrup or molasses. Kaalilaatikko is usually served with lingonberry aka. cowberry jam.

See also
 Cabbage stew
 List of cabbage dishes
 List of casserole dishes

References

External links
 Recipe (in Finnish)

Finnish cuisine
Casserole dishes
Cabbage dishes
Brassica oleracea dishes
Meat dishes
Ground meat
Rice dishes
Barley-based dishes